The 2017 Championnat de France FFSA GT - GT4 European Series Southern Cup was the first season of the GT4 European Series Southern Cup and the 20th season of the French FFSA GT Championship, a sports car championship created and organised by the Stéphane Ratel Organisation (SRO).

Calendar
At the annual press conference during the 2016 24 Hours of Spa on 29 July, the Stéphane Ratel Organisation announced the first draft of the 2017 calendar. The final calendar was announced on 23 December. The series started at Nogaro on 16 April and ended at Paul Ricard on 15 October.

Entry list

Race results
Bold indicates overall winner.

Championship standings
Scoring system
Championship points were awarded for the first ten positions in each race. Entries were required to complete 75% of the winning car's race distance in order to be classified and earn points. Individual drivers were required to participate for a minimum of 25 minutes in order to earn championship points in any race.

Drivers' championship

Teams' championship

See also
2017 GT4 European Series Northern Cup

Notes

References

External links

GT4 European Series
GT4 European Series Southern Cup
GT4 European Series Southern Cup